Beverley "Bev" Noeline Watson (born 1936) is an Australian long jumper who won a bronze medal in the women's long jump event at the 1958 British Empire and Commonwealth Games.

References

External links
 Commonwealth Games Federation athlete ID

1936 births
Australian female long jumpers
Athletes (track and field) at the 1958 British Empire and Commonwealth Games
Commonwealth Games medallists in athletics
Commonwealth Games bronze medallists for Australia
Living people
Medallists at the 1958 British Empire and Commonwealth Games